The Women's keirin was held on 23 October 2011 with 21 riders participating.

Medalists

Results

Qualifying
First 2 riders in each heat qualified for the second round, remainder to first round repechage. Races were held at 11:30.

Heat 1

Heat 2

Heat 3

First Round Repechage
First two riders in each heat qualified for the second round. Races were held at 13:10.

Heat 1

Heat 2

Heat 3

Second round
First 3 riders in each heat qualified for the final 1–6 and the others to final 7–12. Races were held at 15:38.

Heat 1

Heat 2

Finals
The 7–12 place final was held at 17:21, with the final being held at 17:25.

Final 7–12 places

Final

References

2011 European Track Championships
European Track Championships – Women's keirin